Carbamoyl phosphate synthetase (glutamine-hydrolysing) is an enzyme that catalyzes the reactions that produce carbamoyl phosphate in the cytosol (as opposed to type I, which functions in the mitochondria). Its systemic name is hydrogen-carbonate:L-glutamine amido-ligase (ADP-forming, carbamate-phosphorylating).

In pyrimidine biosynthesis, it serves as the rate-limiting enzyme and catalyzes the following reaction:
 2 ATP + L-glutamine + HCO3− + H2O  2 ADP + phosphate + L-glutamate + carbamoyl phosphate (overall reaction)
 (1a) L-glutamine + H2O  L-glutamate + NH3
 (1b) 2 ATP + HCO3− + NH3  2 ADP + phosphate + carbamoyl phosphate

It is activated by ATP and PRPP and it is inhibited by UMP (Uridine monophosphate, the end product of the pyrimidine synthesis pathway).

Neither CPSI nor CPSII require biotin as a coenzyme, as seen with most carboxylation reactions.

It is one of the three enzyme functions coded by the CAD gene. It is classified under .

See also 

 Carbamoyl phosphate synthetase I
 Carbamoyl phosphate synthetase III

References

External links 
 

EC 6.3.5